Dusting may refer to:

 A form of housekeeping involving the removal of dust
 Any act of clearing away dust from a surface
 Crop dusting, the aerial application of fertilizers, pesticides, etc.
 Dusting attack, an attack on a cryptocurrency wallet
 Using fingerprint powder to dust for fingerprints
 "Dusting", a colloquial term for using pressurized dust-clearing spray as an intoxicative inhalant

See also
Dust (disambiguation)
Dusted (disambiguation)
Dustin (disambiguation)